The Real World: Austin is the sixteenth season of MTV's reality television series The Real World, which focuses on a group of diverse strangers living together for several months in a different city each season, as cameras follow their lives and interpersonal relationships. It is the second season to be filmed in the West South Central States region of the United States, specifically in Texas.

The season featured seven people who lived in a converted warehouse, which production started from January to May 2005. Consisting of 24 episodes, the season premiered on June 21 later that year and was watched by nearly 4 million viewers. The Real World: Austin won "Favorite Season" at the 2008 The Real World Awards Bash.

In 2019, the season was made available for streaming on Facebook Watch (alongside the seventeenth and twenty-eighth seasons) ahead of The Real World: Atlantas premiere.

Assignment
Almost every season of The Real World, beginning with its fifth season, has included the assignment of a season-long group job or task to the housemates, continued participation in which has been mandatory to remain part of the cast since the Back to New York season. The Austin cast had to shoot, edit and direct their own documentary on the South by Southwest music festival. Their "boss" was Paul Stekler, an award-winning documentary filmmaker who taught at the University of Texas.

The residence

This season the cast was housed in the west half of a  warehouse at 301 San Jacinto Boulevard at East 3rd Street in Austin, Texas,  of which were used for filming. The interior used for the series was designed by Austin designer Joel Mozersky. Construction took three and a half weeks. 44 cameras were mounted on walls for filming. After filming ended, the warehouse was completely gutted. The west half of it was turned into a Mexican restaurant called The Rio Grande. The east half was leased to a printing services company. The house was converted into the Vince Young Steakhouse, which opened in November 2010.

Cast

: Age at the time of filming.

Episodes

After filming
Six months after the cast left the Real World house, all seven of them appeared to discuss their experiences both during and since their time on the show, Tex, Hugs, & Rock 'n' Roll: The Real World Austin Reunion, which premiered on November 29, 2005, and was hosted by Susie Castillo.

The four female cast mates posed in lingerie for a cover feature in Stuff magazine.

At the 2008 The Real World Awards Bash, the Austin season won "Favorite Season", Danny and Melinda won "Favorite Love Story" and Johanna won "Best Dance-Off". The cast also received a nomination for "Steamiest Scene", Melinda was nominated for "Hottest Female", Danny for "Hottest Male", Johanna for "Best Brush with the Law", Rachel for "Best Meltdown"."The Real World Awards Bash: Winners" . MTV.com. 2008. Retrieved January 17, 2008.

When filming ended Melinda moved to Boston to be with Danny. A film crew followed them in New York City as they took a carriage ride through Central Park and he proposed before the reunion show. On August 2, 2008, they married at Castle Hill outside Boston, with most of their former cast members among those in attendance. Danny owns a construction company while Melinda is planning a career in dentistry. During the premiere of The Challenge: Cutthroat, Melinda revealed in a confessional that she and Danny were going through a divorce. In 2016, Melinda married Matt Collins. Their first child, Camden, was born in 2019. After suffering a miscarriage, their second child, Hayden Thomas, was born in 2022.

Wes and Johanna announced during the reunion show that they began dating several months after the conclusion of filming the show. They appeared together in Real World/Road Rules Challenge: Fresh Meat, and Wes promised to use his prize money to pay for her engagement ring as he won the Real World/Road Rules Challenge: The Duel. At the Real World/Road Rules Challenge: The Gauntlet III reunion show Johanna announced that she and Wes are no longer together. During the reunion special for Real World/Road Rules Challenge: The Island, which premiered November 5, 2008, it was revealed that KellyAnne Judd from The Real World: Sydney was dating Wes at the time. Wes and Johanna both appeared on the Real World/Road Rules Challenge: The Ruins (as did KellyAnne Judd), during which they experienced interpersonal conflicts stemming from the game and relationship issues. During the reunion for The Ruins the two indicated that they were never officially engaged, despite prior indications to the contrary. In a clip from Real World/Road Rules Challenge: The Ruins  reunion, which aired December 16, 2009, Wes and KellyAnne revealed that they were no longer a couple. 

Johanna married Willem Marx. Together they have a child, Diego.

Wes proposed to Amanda Hornick in September 2016 at a Royals baseball game and got married in June 2018. Former roommates Lacey, Melinda, Rachel, Nehemiah and The Challenge costar Devin Walker-Molaghan were in attendance.

The Challenge
This is the third season of The Real World whose entire cast has at one time or another competed in MTV's spin-off reality series The Real World/Road Rules Challenge. The first two are The Real World: Boston and The Real World: New Orleans.

Challenge in bold''' indicates that the contestant was a finalist on the Challenge.

References

External links
The Real World: Austin official site. MTV.
Cast Bios. The Real World: Austin. MTV.
Episodes. The Real World: Austin''. MTV.
The Real World and Road Rules Blog

Austin
Mass media in Austin, Texas
Television shows set in Austin, Texas
2005 American television seasons
2005 in Texas
Television shows filmed in Texas